The Mandaean Book of John (Mandaic language ࡃࡓࡀࡔࡀ ࡖࡉࡀࡄࡉࡀ ) is a Mandaean holy book in Mandaic Aramaic which is believed by Mandeans to have been written by their prophet John the Baptist.

The book contains accounts of John's life and miracles, as well as a number of polemical conversations with Jesus and tractates where Anush Uthra (Enosh) performs miracles in the style of Jesus's deeds in Jerusalem.

Translations
A German translation, Das Johannesbuch der Mandäer, was published by Mark Lidzbarski in 1905. Another German translation of chapters 18–33 (the "Yahya–Yuhana" chapters) was published by Gabriele Mayer in 2021.

Charles G. Häberl and James F. McGrath published a full English translation of the Mandaean Book of John in 2020, which was printed alongside Mandaic text typesetted by Ardwan Alsabti. Another English translation was published by Carlos Gelbert in 2017.

Manuscripts

Archived manuscripts of the Mandaean Book of John known to Western scholars include:

Three Bibliothèque nationale de France manuscripts, also known as the Code Sabéen Mss. 8-10
Paris Ms. A
Paris Ms. B
Paris Ms. C
Huntington MS 71 (abbreviated Hunt. 71, held in the Bodleian Library; Lidzbarski's D manuscript)
DC 30 (Manuscript 30 of E. S. Drower's collection, held in the Bodleian Library). Purchased by E. S. Drower from Shaikh Nejm (also spelled "Negm") and Shaikh Yahya in November 1937. Dates to 1166 A.H. (c. 1753 A.D.). Copied in Shushtar by Ram Yuhana, son of Ram, Dihdaria.

Several folia (pages) in two manuscripts held at the British Library contain parts of the Mandaean Book of John:
Folia 76-98 of Add. 23,602a
Folia of 99-101 Add. 23,602a and 15-18 of Add. 23,602b

Buckley has also analyzed three manuscripts that are privately held by Mandaeans in the United States, including in Flushing (original manuscript belonging to Nasser Sobbi), Niskayuna (later moved to Colonie; photocopy of a manuscript belonging to Dr. Sinan Abdullah from Ahvaz), and San Diego (original manuscript belonging to Lamea Abbas Amara).

In the early 1900s, E. S. Drower had also transcribed the "Soul Fisher" chapters (36-39) from Sheikh Negm bar Zihrun.

Contents
There are 76 chapters (or tractates) in the Mandaean Book of John. Chapter titles from Gelbert (2017) (based on the titles in Lidzbarski 1920) are given by default, with alternative titles from Häberl and McGrath (2020) given in square brackets. The contents are:

Truth's Questions (1-2)
1. Truth Stands by the Worlds' Entrance
2. Truth Stands by the Worlds' Entrance
Yushamin (3-10)
3. Splendor Has Come to Me in Plenty
4. By My Own Authority
5. As My Father Yushamin Plotted
6. On the Day the Intellect Taught Yushamin
7. When I, Yushamin, Thought
8. A Voice Came to Me in the Jordan
9. Whom Shall I Call, Who Would Answer Me
10. I Said That I Would Be Great
The Good Shepherd (11-12)
11. I Am a Shepherd Who Loves His Sheep
12. An Excellency Calls from Beyond
The Creation (13 and 60)
Truth's Shem (Šum Kušṭa) (14-17)
14. Truth's Shem Begins Teaching
15. Truth's Shem Begins Teaching (cf. Psalms of Thomas 18)
16. Truth's Shem Begins Teaching
17. Truth's Shem Begins Teaching (cf. Psalms of Thomas 17)
John-Johannes (18-33)
18. A Child was Transplanted from on High
19. I Shine in the Name of My Father
20. The Sun Sat in its Seclusion
21. Did I Not Go Away Alone and Return?
22. He Called Out a Proclamation to the World
23. Beware for Me, My Brothers
24. I Was in the House of My Seclusion
25. Noble Men, Who Are Sleeping
26. The Ages Took No Pleasure in Me
27. Is There Anyone Greater Than I?
28. Lofty Strongholds Will Fall
29. I Shine Forth in My Father's Name
30. Who Told Jesus?
31. The Spheres and the Chariot Trembled
32. The Spheres and the Chariot Trembled
33. At My Voice, Spheres Shake
Miriai (34-35)
34. I am Miriai, the Daughter of Babylon's Kings
35. I am Miriai, a Vine
The Soul Fisher (36-39)
36. A Fisher am I
37. A Fisher Am I, of the Great Life
38. The Fisher Put on Bright Garments
39. It Is the Voice of the Pure Fisher
The Iron Shoe (40-41)
40. An Excellency Preaches Forth from Beyond
41. The Man Preaches from Beyond
Admonitions from Manda d-Hayyi (42-47)
42. It is the Voice of Manda d-Hayyi
Warnings (43-45)
43. It is the Voice of Manda d-Hayyi
44. Life's Herald Calls Forth (also in Right Ginza 15.18 according to the numbering in Lidzbarski 1920)
45. Life's Herald Calls Forth
Three Wishes (46) [From Light's Place, I Left] (also in Right Ginza 15.19 according to the numbering in Lidzbarski 1920)
Warnings (47) [From Light's Place, I Left] (cf. Psalms of Thomas 12)
Truth (48-51)
A Second Prayer (48) [Truth! I Testify to You] (also in Right Ginza 16.9)
The Plough (49) [Way Beyond, Beside the Barrier of Truth]
Warnings (50) [He Who Deals in Gifts and Rewards]
The River Kšaš (51) [Among Those Lying upon the Shore]
The Planets (52-56)
Yōrabba (52) [He Shook and Disturbed Yurba]
Sén [the Moon] (53) [When the Shining was Planted] (also in Right Ginza 15.4)
The Alien Man in Jerusalem (54) [I Did Not and Do Not Want]
Hibil's Lament (55) [How Can I Rejoice?]
The Immaculate (56) [Whoever Keeps Perfect Within It]
Life's Treasure (57-59)
The Creation (60-62)
60. To You I Speak and Teach
61. Who Will Come Forth, and Who Will Tell Me?
62. When the Earth Did Not Yet Exist
The Aftermath (63-67)
63. A Voice from on High Cried Out to Us
64. I Have Come to This World
65. In a Bright Cloud I Sit
66. Way Out Beyond
67. From Beyond, an Excellency Cries Out
Manda d-Hayyi's Visits (68-69)
68. When Manda d-Hayyi Went
69. The Light was Planted
Abatur's Lament (70-72)
70. When the Scales Did Not Want
71. When They Went Forth and Came to Abatur
72. When He Came to Abatur
Three Laments (73-75)
73. A White Eagle Am I
74. Excellent Enosh Spoke
75. Over Yonder, by the Seashore
Excellent Enosh in Jerusalem (76) [I Come with Sandals of Precious Stones]

Chapters 19–33 begin with the formula:

In Mandaic:

See also 
 Ginza Rabba

References

External links 
A complete open-access translation of the Mandaean Book of John, published in 2020, edited by Charles G. Häberl and James F. McGrath
The Mandaean Book of John: Text and Translation (Charles G. Häberl and James F. McGrath) at Humanities Commons
Mandaean Book of John translation project
Mandaean Book of John (Mandaic text from the Mandaean Network)
Mandaean Book of John (Mandaic text from the Mandaean Network)

1st-century texts
2nd-century texts
3rd-century texts
John the Baptist
Mandaean texts
Mythology books